Villasanti is an Italian surname. Notable people with the surname include:

Mario Villasanti (born 1982), Paraguayan footballer
Mathías Villasanti (born 1997), Paraguayan footballer
Raimundo Rolón Villasanti (1903–1981), President of Paraguay in 1949
Richard Villasanti (born 1980), Australian rugby league player

Italian-language surnames